This article is about episodes of the anime Sister Princess, divided into the two seasons. Since ADV only has the license for the first season, the English titles below for the first season are those officially given by ADV; those of the second season are just approximate translations taken from here.

Sister Princess (1st season)

There is also an episode 0 called Sister Princess Eve (シスター♥プリンセス 前夜祭) which was just a talk show/documentary which introduced the twelve sisters with their voice actresses. It was aired a week before the first episode (March 28, 2001).

Sister Princess RePure (2nd season)
Except for the last episode, each episode is divided into two parts, labelled below as "A-side" and "B-side."

Sister Princess
Sister Princess